William E. Crosby (born November 29, 1937) is an American politician who was a member of the South Carolina House of Representatives from the 117th District, serving from 2010 to 2018. He is a member of the Republican party.

References

Living people
1937 births
Republican Party members of the South Carolina House of Representatives
21st-century American politicians
Politicians from Charleston, South Carolina